was a village located in Iwata District, Shizuoka Prefecture, Japan.

At the time of its merger, the village had an estimated population of 1,123 and a density of 16 persons per km2. The total area was 70.23 km2.

On July 1, 2005, Tatsuyama, along with the cities of Tenryū and Hamakita, the town of Haruno (from Shūchi District), the towns of Hosoe, Inasa and Mikkabi (all from Inasa District), the towns of Misakubo and Sakuma (all from Iwata District), and the towns of Maisaka and Yūtō (both from Hamana District), was merged into the expanded city of Hamamatsu. It was the last village within Shizuoka Prefecture. It is now part of Tenryū-ku, Hamamatsu City.

External links
 Hamamatsu official website 
 Tatsuyama J.H.S.official website 
  Tatsuyama official sight seeing website 

Dissolved municipalities of Shizuoka Prefecture
Hamamatsu